The Seminary Singers of the Boston University School of Theology was begun in 1926 under the direction of Dr. James R. Houghton. The present day choir provides choral music for the Marsh Chapel at a weekly chapel service. The choir is non-audition based and is open to students, faculty, and staff of the University.

The Seminary Singers perform under the direction of Reverend Chad William Kidd.

About the Choir 
Approximately 30 singers form the choir, a group that regularly performs at Boston University chapel services and other special Boston University events. The group frequently goes on tour to perform at churches around New England, travels from which the group has recorded and produced several musical albums.

The weekly schedule of the Seminary Singers involves rehearsals from 5 to 6:30 PM on Tuesday afternoons in addition to a rehearsal and service on Wednesday mornings.

External links
Official site

References

Choirs in Massachusetts
University choirs